The Chizerots are a historic group of people living in a small locality in Burgundy, France, who are somewhat different in appearance and customs to their neighbours.  Their origins are uncertain.

North of Mâcon and south of Tournus, on both banks of the Saône, there are, on one side, the villages of Boz, Ozan, Arbigny and Sermoyer, whose inhabitants call themselves Burkins, and on the other side, the village of Uchizy, whose inhabitants go by the name of Chizerots. In contradiction to M. Reboud, M. Reinaud seems to doubt their Saracen origin: "In 1862 I went to Uchizy and Arbigny; several persons there told me themselves that they were of Arabian or Saracenic origin. In the midst of numerous individuals, having apparently no very distinct anthropological characters, some very black haired women differed from the inhabitants of the neighbourhood by their tall and slender figure; their elongated faces, without malar prominences, by their uniform and dark complexion, by their large eyes, long eyelashes, black, thick and arched eye- brows, by their physiognomy, melancholy, yet regular and beautiful; for one of these young Chizerotes, when the French empress passed through Macon, had been appointed, as the most beautiful girl of the whole district, to offer a bouquet to her sovereign. That type seems more Arabian than Berberic."

References

Burgundy
Ain
Auvergne-Rhône-Alpes
Saône-et-Loire
Ethnic groups in France